Sylverino is an unincorporated community in Miller County, Arkansas, United States.

References

Unincorporated communities in Miller County, Arkansas
Unincorporated communities in Arkansas